The Grace Methodist Episcopal Church in Wichita, Kansas, later known as Grace United Methodist Church, is a historic church at 944 S. Topeka. It was built in 1910 and added to the National Register in 2006.

It is a two-story Classical Revival-style church designed by architect C. W. Terry, and was built at a cost of $65,000.

C.W. Terry also designed the J.E. Raymond House in Girard, Kansas. It too is NRHP-listed.

References

Methodist churches in Kansas
Churches on the National Register of Historic Places in Kansas
Neoclassical architecture in Kansas
Churches completed in 1910
Churches in Wichita, Kansas
National Register of Historic Places in Wichita, Kansas
Neoclassical church buildings in the United States